Aleksey Vasilyevich Shumakov (born 7 September 1948) is a Russian wrestler. He was Olympic gold medalist in Greco-Roman wrestling in 1976, competing for the Soviet Union.

References

External links
 

1948 births
Living people
People from Krasnoyarsk Krai
Soviet male sport wrestlers
Olympic wrestlers of the Soviet Union
Wrestlers at the 1976 Summer Olympics
Russian male sport wrestlers
Olympic gold medalists for the Soviet Union
Olympic medalists in wrestling
Medalists at the 1976 Summer Olympics
Sportspeople from Krasnoyarsk Krai